Quisqueya Stadium Juan Marichal is a baseball stadium in Santo Domingo, Dominican Republic. It is often used as a multi-use stadium. Football club Atlético Pantoja used the venue for their inaugural Caribbean football championship match. The Quisqueya holds about 14,469 people after its renovation.  The Dominican League of Baseball Authority is in charge of its management.

It is the only stadium in the Caribbean region to host two different baseball teams, Tigres del Licey (Licey Tigers) and Leones del Escogido (Chosen One Lions). Its field dimensions are 335 feet at the foul poles, 383 feet at the power alleys, and 411 feet at center field. It was built in 1955 as Estadio Trujillo, during the Rafael Leonidas Trujillo Molina dictatorship, taking the Bobby Maduro Miami Stadium as the design base.

The stadium was renamed Estadio Quisqueya Juan Marichal, after the former Major League Baseball player and Hall of Famer Juan Marichal.

Early statistics in the Estadio Quisqueya

 First hit: Alcibíades Colón (Licey) against Donald Elston (Stars) October 23, 1955
 First double: Luis "Grillo" Báez (Licey), October 23, 1955
 First triple: Bob Wilson (Licey), October 23, 1955
 First HR: Emil Panko (Eagles), October 24, 1955
 First out: Pablo Garcia (Licey) October 23, 1955
 First RBI: Pablo Garcia (Licey) October 23, 1955

Rebuilding projects
In 2007 The stadium underwent a rebuilding job which expanded its number of seats and the overall look of the field. The bullpens are now enclosed and out of play. Former president Leonel Fernández also announced in 2009 that there are plans to turn the stadium and the adjacent area into a modern sports complex.

The construction of a 5-star hotel at the end of the central garden was also planned, in addition to a building that would house a casino and a sports museum. Due to the criticism received from many sectors for the way in which the remodeling was going to be financed, the Dominican State announced the suspension of the project.

For the 2010-2011 season, the bleacher area was reduced from 9,600 seats to 9,500 to expand the 'AA' boxes from 5,843 to 7,443 seats. For the 2014 - 2015 season it was renewed again and the area of the bleachers was reduced from 9,500 to 8,015 and other areas as well.

Gallery

Notable events

Serie del Caribe 1972, 1976, 1980, 1988, 1996, 2000, 2004, 2012, 2016 and 2022.

See also
Estadio Cibao
Estadio Julian Javier
Estadio Tetelo Vargas

References

Baseball venues in the Dominican Republic
Dominican Republic
Venues of the 2003 Pan American Games
Sports venues in Santo Domingo